The Naukan, also known as the Naukanski, are a Siberian Yupik people and an indigenous people of Siberia. They live in the Chukotka Autonomous Region of eastern Russia.

Language
The Naukan Yupik language is a Yupik language, belonging to the Eskimo–Aleut languages. Many Naukan people now speak the Chukchi language.

Culture

Traditionally Naukan people hunted sea mammals. Guests from remote settlements traveled from remote settlements to participate in pol'a', the month-long Naukan whale festival.

History
Archaeological evidence places the Naukan on the Chukotka Peninsula off the Bering Sea back 2,000 years. They used to live on Big Diomede Island and Cape Dezhnev in the Bering Strait. The Soviet Union relocated Naukan people from their traditional coastal village of Naukan in 1958. They now reside in the indigenous village of Lorino.

See also
 Yaranga, a conical reindeer-hide tent
 Central Siberian Yupik language
 Sirenik Yupik
 Yupik peoples
 Indigenous small-numbered peoples of the North, Siberia and the Far East

Notes

External links

 Naukan abandoned Village on Cape Dezhnev Peninsula, Siberia, photo gallery

Ethnic groups in Siberia
Chukchi Sea
Indigenous small-numbered peoples of the North, Siberia and the Far East
Siberian Yupik